Milim (Hebrew מילים "words"), English title Metamorphosis of a Melody is a 1996 Israeli drama film by Amos Gitai. The film starring Ronit Elkabetz and Samuel Fuller is based on The Jewish War by Josephus. It is a cinematic realisation of stage-based productions by Gitai.

Plot 
The film follows Jewish resistance as they face a series of challenges against the Romans. Chronicling the capture of Jerusalem by the Seleucid ruler Antiochus IV Epiphanes in 164 BC to the fall and destruction of Jerusalem in the First Jewish-Roman War in AD 70.

Cast
Ronit Elkabetz
Samuel Fuller as Flavius (narrator)
Efratia Gitai as Memory Holder
Masha Itkina as Nightingale
Jerome Koenig as Emperor Titus
Enrico Lo Verso as Defender of Masada
Ilan Mosovitch 
Shuli Rand as The Cantor
Hanna Schygulla as Spirit of Exile

References

External links

1996 films
Israeli drama films
Films about Jews and Judaism
Films shot in Israel
Films directed by Amos Gitai
1990s Hebrew-language films